Frank Harris Quillen (December 18, 1920 – September 21, 1990) was an American football end.

Quillen was born in Ridley Park, Pennsylvania, and attended Ridley Park High School and the Franklin & Marshall Academy. He played college football for Penn. 

He played professional football in the All-America Football Conference for the Chicago Rockets from 1946 to 1947. He appeared in 20 games, six as a starter, and caught 20 passes for 256 yards and three touchdowns.

After retiring from football, Quillen worked for 40 years with Chester Mack Sales & Services in Delaware.  He died in Hockessin, Delaware, in 1990.

References

1920 births
1990 deaths
American football ends
Chicago Rockets players
Penn Quakers football players
Players of American football from Pennsylvania